Heino Veskila (14 December 1918 – 22 July 1941) was an Estonian basketball player who played for Tartu YMCA, Tartu EASK and Tartu Dünamo. He also represented the Estonia men's national basketball team internationally.

Veskila competed for Estonia in the 1936 Summer Olympics in basketball. A record he set was being the youngest participant among all basketball players, at the age of 17. Despite his very young age, he averaged 13 points per game, including 20 against the USA, out of Estonia's total of 28.

Veskila made the All-Tournament Team at the EuroBasket 1937 and was the leading scorer at the EuroBasket 1939, with 116 points in seven games. He earned 17 caps in basketball for the Estonian national team.

Veskila died on 22 July 1941 as a prisoner-of-war.

Awards and accomplishments

 EuroBasket 1937 All-Tournament Team
 EuroBasket 1939 Leading Scorer

References and notes

External links
 

1918 births
1941 deaths
Estonian men's basketball players
Korvpalli Meistriliiga players
Olympic basketball players of Estonia
Basketball players at the 1936 Summer Olympics
University of Tartu basketball team players
Sportspeople from Tartu
Forwards (basketball)
Estonian people who died in Soviet detention
Estonian prisoners of war